Titouan Perrin-Ganier (born 28 June 1991) is a French cross-country mountain biker. He specializes in the cross-country eliminator event, in which he was world champion in 2017, 2018, 2019, and 2020. He was also European champion in the cross-country eliminator in 2017 and 2018. Ganier is a five-time national cross-country eliminator champion, winning five consecutive years, from 2013 to 2017.

Major results

2009
 2nd National Junior XCO Championships
2013
 1st  National XCE Championships
2014
 1st  National XCE Championships
2015
 1st  National XCE Championships
2016
 1st  National XCE Championships
2017
 1st  UCI World XCE Championships
 1st  European XCE Championships
 1st  National XCE Championships
2018
 1st  UCI World XCE Championships
 1st  European XCE Championships
 1st  National XCE Championships
2019
 1st  UCI World XCE Championships
 2nd Overall UCI XCE World Cup
 2nd  European XCE Championships
 2nd National XCE Championships
2020
 1st  UCI World XCE Championships
 1st  European XCE Championships
 1st  National XCE Championships

References

External links

French male cyclists
French mountain bikers
Living people
1991 births